Sabrina: The Animated Series is an American animated television series based on the Archie Comics series Sabrina the Teenage Witch. Produced by Savage Studios Ltd. and Hartbreak Films in association with DIC Productions, L.P. (owned by Disney at the time), the series is an animated spin-off of the 1996–2003 live-action series Sabrina the Teenage Witch.

The series aired on ABC (also owned by Disney) and UPN from September 6 to November 19, 1999. 65 episodes were produced.

Premise
Unlike previous incarnations, Sabrina Spellman in this series is depicted as a 12-year-old attending middle school. As in the original comic series, Sabrina lives with her paternal witch aunts, Hilda Spellman and Zelda Spellman and her loud-mouthed black cat Salem Saberhagen, all of whom advise Sabrina on the use of several magics. Most episodes center on the typical issues of middle school, along with those that emanated from Sabrina's inexperience with or misuse of several magic, witchcraft and extremely powerful and complex spells. Sabrina and her best friend Chloe would often use magic (often from the "Spooky Jar"; a cookie jar containing a genie-like being in the family's kitchen) for all types of perceived emergencies, ranging from trying to fit into skinny new clothes to turning Sabrina's crush Harvey into a superhero. By the end of each episode, her innate magical abilities would unintentionally backfire and Sabrina would learn that using magic usually is not the solution to her everyday issues.

Characters

Main
 Sabrina Spellman: Sabrina is a half witch-half mortal that won't become magically empowered until she's 16, but she is able to borrow spells from her aunts Hilda and Zelda using a magical "Spooky Jar," which she often does. The series follows her into her preteen years. However, she usually finds that her meddling turns situations from bad to worse. Her friend Chloe is aware of Sabrina's magic but Harvey Kinkle, another friend and her romantic interest, isn't. She is secretly in love with Harvey and wants one day to marry him. When she casts a spell, the magic is made in pink and yellow. She is voiced by Emily Hart, Melissa Joan Hart's real-life sister who played Sabrina's cousin Amanda in two episodes of the Sabrina the Teenage Witch TV series. 
 Hilda Spellman and Zelda Spellman: While Hilda suggests they bend the rules sometime and use magic to get ahead, Zelda is determined to say no right up until the moment she gives up. Hilda is more carefree and reckless than her cautious sister Zelda, and, although they do butt heads sometimes, they are still sisters. In this series and Sabrina's Secret Life, Hilda and Zelda both have the appearance of teenagers, as this was the punishment they received from Enchantra for "abusing magic" in the past. Whenever Zelda casts a spell, the magic is always made in blue and yellow. When Hilda casts a spell, the magic is made in purple and yellow. They are both voiced by Melissa Joan Hart, known for playing Sabrina in the Showtime film adaptation and the ABC series.
 Salem Saberhagen: Salem knows the right buttons to push to talk Sabrina into just about anything, and he does it guiltlessly—until he's caught. Salem was once a powerful wizard, but he was locked into a cat-form because he was constantly trying to take over the world. However, he makes up for his predicament with magical charms that help Sabrina in some situations. He is voiced by Nick Bakay, the only cast member to reprise his role from the 1996 Sabrina, the Teenage Witch TV series.
Uncle Quigley: Uncle Quigley is an original character created for the animated series. He is Sabrina's maternal great-uncle and the household's adult guardian. Uncle Quigley does not have any magic powers, like Sabrina's mother he is a mortal. He is voiced by Jay Brazeau.
 Chloe Flan: Sabrina's best friend who, other than Uncle Quigley, is the only mortal who knows Sabrina's secret. She is voiced by Cree Summer.
 Harvey Kinkle: Harvey has a cute and sweet personality. While he only admits to Sabrina that she is his "best pal," he likes her very much. However, Harvey is unaware Sabrina is a witch although often sees the results of the magic himself. He is voiced by Bill Switzer.
 Gemini "Gem" Stone: A snobby, pampered and very spoiled mean girl who lives down the street and sees Sabrina as her main competitor for Harvey's attention (whom Gem is interested in as well), though Harvey likes Sabrina more. She is similar to Libby Chesler (Jenna Leigh Green) in the TV series. She is voiced by Chantal Strand.

Supporting
 Spookie Jar: A genie who resides in a purple cookie jar in Sabrina's kitchen. Whenever Sabrina needs a special spell, she can get one from the Spookie Jar, but they rarely turn out the way she expects. Spookie Jar speaks entirely in rhymes. He is voiced by David Sobolov.
 Perry "Pi" McDonald: Harvey's best friend and Sabrina and Chloe's friend, too. He is very smart and quite unusual in his own special way. His eyes are never seen because his pork pie hat obscures them. He has been described by Sabrina as "totally out of it and really smart at the same time." According to the episode "Upside Down Town," it is implied that he is of Chinese descent. He is voiced by Chantal Strand.
 Horace Slugloafe: An occasional bully to Harvey, though at times shows him respect. He usually refers to others by their surnames. He is voiced by Jason Michas.
 Bernard: A small, bald, nerdy boy with glasses who is friends with Sabrina, Pi, Chloe and Harvey. He is often bullied by Slugloafe and easily bossed around by Gem. He is voiced by Chantal Strand.
 Tim the Witch Smeller: Tim is a witch hunter who appears in "Most Dangerous Witch," "Documagicary" and "Enchanted Vacation." He was previously bullied by witches as a child due to his lack of magical powers, except his immortality, even though his mother was a witch. For this reason, he viewed witches as evil and so he collects them as trophies for revenge along with his sidekick aardvark named Elton. Tim wears a hat with a witch cauldron marked with a ban sign on it.
 Queen Enchantra: The ruler of all witches and head of the Witches' Council. When she casts spells, the magic is made in red and purple. She was voiced by Kathleen Barr, who reprises the role in the later series Sabrina: Secrets of a Teenage Witch.
 Mr. and Mrs. Stone: Gem's parents are the richest people in town. They first appeared in "Witch Switch"; when Sabrina wishes herself to be rich, they almost sent Sabrina to Cambridge when they found out she got a C in her report, but later changed their mind after Sabrina is not wished herself as being rich. They also appeared in "Stone Broke" when they lost their money and had Gem move into Sabrina's house until their dog struck oil.
 Edward Spellman: Sabrina's long-lost father who is a very strong witch and Zelda and Hilda's younger brother. Some years after he and his mortal wife, Diana, mutually separated, he ended up falling for another human named Futura, whom he intended to marry until a jealous Sabrina tried to break them up.
 Diana Spellman: Sabrina's human mother who is an archeologist and works at a dig site in Egypt. She is heard in the episode "Picture Perfect."

Production
Sabrina had previously appeared in an animated format on The Archie Show (animated by Filmation), but the popularity of the live-action Sabrina the Teenage Witch sitcom formed part of the basis for this spin-off series. The series was developed by Savage Steve Holland and Kat Likkel and Holland served as showrunner and executive producer of the series. As such, the series reflected some of the irreverent style of humor seen in Eek! The Cat. Celebrity voice cameos in this series included Mr. T, Long John Baldry and "Weird Al" Yankovic. Melissa Joan Hart, who starred as Sabrina in the live-action sitcom, served as producer of this series, but her younger sister, Emily Hart (who played the recurring character Amanda on the sitcom), voiced Sabrina. Melissa instead voiced Sabrina's two aunts, Hilda and Zelda, originally played on the live-action series by Beth Broderick and Caroline Rhea, respectively. Nick Bakay reprises his role as Salem from the live-action series. The theme music is performed by the Irish girl group B*Witched.

The series was announced to be in production in November 1998, where 65 episodes were commissioned by Disney to air on UPN's then-upcoming Disney block, and would also air on ABC. Disney's Buena Vista Television were announced as the distributor, while DIC Entertainment and Viacom Consumer Products would handle and share merchandising rights. In January 1999, Disney's international sales distributor Buena Vista International Television were confirmed as worldwide distributor of the series.

Episodes

Broadcast

United States
The series aired in syndication on UPN (on Disney's One Too weekday morning-afternoon and Sunday block) and on ABC (on Disney's One Saturday Morning block) from September 6 to November 19, 1999; it remained on both blocks until 2002, when the series moved to both Disney Channel (from September 3, 2002 to September 2, 2004) and Toon Disney (from September 3, 2002 to September 5, 2004). Sabrina: The Animated Series was one of the launch programmes broadcast on the Syndicated DIC Kids Network E/I block, followed by the spinoff series Sabrina's Secret Life.

In the 2006-07 television season, the series returned as part of CBS' new KOL Secret Slumber Party on CBS and was briefly part of the KEWLopolis cartoon lineup. On September 19, 2009, the series returned to CBS, this time as part of the network's Cookie Jar TV cartoon lineup, until 2010, being replaced with Sabrina's Secret Life. Reruns aired on This TV through the "This Is for Kids" block, from September 24, 2012 to October 25, 2013.

From 2017 to 2020, reruns of the series started airing on the Starz channel, Starz Kids & Family; the series is also available on Starz Play.  the series is also available on Pluto TV's After School Cartoons channel.

International
In Canada, the series aired on Teletoon from late-1999 to mid-2005. The series also aired on many Disney Channel networks internationally.

Beginning in 2004, many broadcasters who already aired the series began to air it as part of a package with Sabrina's Secret Life titled "Totally Sabrina." The package was pre-sold to TF1 in France, RTÉ in Ireland, Mediaset in Italy, ORF in Austria, Alter Channel in Greece, FORTA in Spain, SBT in Brazil, Teletoon in Canada, Super RTL in Germany, Noga Communications in Israel and Saran in Turkey, in addition to Disney Channel and Toon Disney networks in the United Kingdom, Asia, Taiwan, Australia, France, Latin America, Brazil, the Middle East and Spain.

The series also aired in India on Cartoon Network.

Home media

United States
In February 2001, DIC announced the formation of their home video subsidiary DIC Home Entertainment, and that Sabrina: The Animated Series would be one of the shows from their catalogue released through the division.

International
In the Philippines, Viva Video and Cookie Jar Entertainment released a few DVD sets in the countries.

In the United Kingdom, budget distributor Prism Leisure and Fremantle Home Entertainment released "Sabrina in Love" and "Salem's World" on DVD which had the same 2 episodes as the US VHS releases respectively, but including an additional episode. An exclusive UK DVD titled "Witchy Girls" was also released in the same year, also containing 3 episodes.

Reception
Common Sense Media gave the series a three out of five stars and said, "Parents need to know that this tween cartoon -- a spin-off of the live-action sitcom Sabrina, the Teenage Witch -- features similar lighthearted witch humor. Storylines focus on the trials and tribulations of being a tween: friendships, school assignments, and dealing with increasing responsibility. Many of the characters set positive examples of what it means to be a good friend."

Merchandise
Viacom Consumer Products and DIC Entertainment co-released merchandise based on the series.

An 11-inch Sabrina fashion doll was released by the company Bambola.  Several other small plastic toys, including a few figurines and a Polly Pocket-esque Sabrina doll were sold in stores while the series was in production.

Video games
On August 17, 2000, Simon & Schuster Interactive's Knowledge Adventure and Havas Interactive officially announced the video game Sabrina The Animated Series: Magical Adventure for the Microsoft Windows and Macintosh computer systems. It was released in October 2000, and followed by Sabrina The Animated Series: Zapped! for the Game Boy Color system, released on November 22, 2000,
   
On September 4, 2001, it was announced that Simon & Schuster Interactive had acquired the rights to the series, under license from Viacom Consumer Products based on the video game license. They subsequently released Sabrina The Animated Series: Spooked! (which contains the first levels for Game Boy Color platform). It was released on November 6, 2001.

Spin-offs

Cancelled Salem spin-off
In November 2000, following their separation and re-independence from Disney, DIC Entertainment announced they would produce a spin-off based on Salem the Cat, simply titled Salem. The series was planned to have 52 half-hour episodes, each budgeted at $275,000 to $325,000, and would air in the Fall of 2001, with DIC holding all worldwide distribution rights. The series never saw the light the day after its initial announcement, meaning it likely never got off the drawing board. 

The series would have focused on Salem's attempts to become a warlock again by proceeding to do enough good deeds, but lets his attitude and wit get the better of him.

Sabrina: Friends Forever

A TV movie, titled Sabrina: Friends Forever aired on Nickelodeon in the United States on October 13, 2002 as part of the Nickelodeon Sunday Movie Toons series of television movies. The movie was later pre-sold internationally to various Disney Channel networks, among others.

The movie centers on Sabrina going to Witch Academy to become full witch, but is unsure if she will be accepted due to being half-witch, until she meets Nicole, a girl who is also half-witch like she is.

Sabrina's Secret Life

A sequel series, titled Sabrina's Secret Life was co-produced with DIC's French subsidiary Les Studios Tex and broadcaster TF1, and premiered on DIC's syndicated television block DIC Kids Network in November 2003 before being pre-sold internationally.

The series centers on a 14-year-old Sabrina attending High School and also attending special witch classes with rival Cassandra, who unlike Sabrina, is a full-witch.

Comic book series
While Sabrina: The Animated Series was airing, Archie Comics printed a comic spin-off for the show. The first issue was dated January 2000 (meaning it was on-sale in late 1999), and it lasted for 37 issues. In order to tie the plot in with their Sabrina series, it was stated in the first issue that Repulsa the Goblin Gueen had sent Sabrina back in time to relive her pre-teen years, so that she would be out of the way while Repulsa attempted to conquer Enchantra's realm. In issue 38, the Repulsa plot was resolved, and the comic book returned to chronicling the teenage Sabrina in the next issue.

See also
 List of animated spin-offs from prime time shows

References

External links
About Sabrina Animated Series at DHX Media
 

1990s American animated television series
1990s American sitcoms
1999 American television series debuts
1999 American television series endings
American animated sitcoms
American animated television spin-offs
American Broadcasting Company original programming
American children's animated adventure television series
American children's animated comedy television series
American children's animated fantasy television series
American children's animated supernatural television series
American prequel television series
Animated television series about children
Animated television series about cats
Disney's One Too
English-language television shows
First-run syndicated television programs in the United States
Middle school television series
Sabrina the Teenage Witch
Television shows based on Archie Comics
Television series by DIC Entertainment
Television series by DHX Media
Television about magic
Toon Disney original programming
UPN original programming
Television series about witchcraft
ABC Kids (TV programming block)
Television series created by Savage Steve Holland